La Lupita is a Mexican band that combines rock and Latin music.  Their lyrics are humorous and sometimes sarcastic.  They released their first album, Pa' Servir a Ud, in 1992, combining heavy metal, norteñas, disco music, funk, mambo, and pop.  They recorded their next album, Que Bonito es Casi Todo, two years later in London.  They released their third album, known as 3D, in 1996; their fourth album, Caramelo Macizo, in 1998; and their fifth album, Lupitología, a compilation, in 2004.

Original members
Hector Quijada: Vocals
Rosa Adame: Vocals
Lino Nava: Guitar
Poncho Toledo: Bass
Ernesto "Bola" Domene: Drums
Michel DeQuevedo: Percussion

Current members
Hector Quijada: Vocals
Rosa Adame: Vocals
Lino Nava: Guitar
Luis Fernando Alejo: Bass
Paco Godoy: Drums

Other members
Miguel Rodríguez: Bass
Mayo Mello: Bass
Sarahí "La de Santa Maria del Nabo": Vocals
Daniel "El Piolín": Drums
Enrique Garcia: Percussions
Tomás Pérez Ascencio: Drums

References

 Biografía de La Lupita
 [ allmusic (La Lupita Overview)]

External links
 La Lupita's MySpace

Mexican rock music groups
Mexican alternative rock groups
Rock en Español music groups
Musical groups established in 1991
1991 establishments in Mexico